Athol is a rural locality in the Toowoomba Region, Queensland, Australia.

Geography
The Gore Highway passes through Athol, with an intersection of the following road segments in the locality. To the north-east the Gore Highway is now part of the Toowoomba Bypass, while to the east is the former Gore Highway alignment, now known as the Toowoomba Athol Road (A139). To the south-west is the unchanged portion of the Gore Highway.

History
Westbrook Provisional School opened on 25 July 1887. In 1903, it was renamed Athol Provisional School and became Athol State School on  1 October 1910. It closed on 20 July 1962. It was located on the north-east corner of Athol School Road and Berghofer Road.

References

Further reading
 
 

Toowoomba Region
Localities in Queensland